Werenfels is a surname. Notable people with the surname include:

Peter Werenfels (1627–1703), Swiss theologian and professor
Samuel Werenfels (1657–1740), Swiss theologian, son of Peter
Samuel Werenfels (1720–1800), Swiss architect

Surnames of Swiss origin